The 8th Ukrainian Verkhovna Rada began its term on 27 November 2014. 421 people's deputies were elected during the 2014 Ukrainian parliamentary elections.

References

2014-2019
Parliamentary election